xoJane (also known as xoJane.com) was an American online magazine from 2011 to 2016 geared toward women and founded by Jane Pratt and co-published by Say Media. Pratt was the founding editor of Sassy and Jane magazines.

In less than two months from the launch date,  established itself as one of Forbes' "Top 10 Lifestyle Websites for Women". Pratt served as editor-in-chief with Emily McCombs as executive editor, Lesley Kinzel as deputy editor and Mandy Stadtmiller as editor-at-large.

Pratt launched a British sister site, xojane.co.uk, in June 2012, with Rebecca Holman as editor. In March 2013,  launched spinoff beauty site .

In December 2016, Time indicated that it would be folding xoJane into InStyle, following reports that Pratt was leaving Time and looking for a new owner for her web properties. In 2016, a statement from Time said that the site would redirect to InStyle.com, an internal xoJane letter said that the site remained available through 2016 with no new content. As of 2017 xoJane content and articles are unavailable and the xoJane site redirects to the Time, Inc. site HelloGiggles.

References

External links 

Lifestyle magazines published in the United States
Online magazines published in the United States
Defunct women's magazines published in the United States
Internet properties established in 2011
Internet properties disestablished in 2016
Lifestyle websites
Magazines established in 2011
American women's websites
2011 establishments in the United States
Magazines disestablished in 2016